Gaspar Antonio Chi (c. 1531–1610; also known as Gaspar Antonio de Herrera) was a Maya noble of Mani. Gaspar Antonio was of the Chi chibal (lineage) through his father Napuc Chi, and the Xiu chibal through his mother, Ix Kukil Xiu. He worked primarily as a translator between Spanish and Maya, and is thought to have been an important source of information for Diego de Landa in writing his Relación de las cosas de Yucatán.

Notes

References
 
 
  
 
  
 
 

1530s births
1610 deaths
Maya people
Mexican translators